SCV Srl (formerly SCAM srl.) is an Italian truck manufacturer and modification company founded in 1995. Partnered with Iveco from the start, SCAM builds vehicles using the Iveco Daily as a base. SCAM produces special vehicles for markets where climatic conditions require the use of engines type Euro3. SCAM vehicles are primarily marketed to military, government, and municipal customers. In the year 2017 the company changed its name to SCV srl.

Products
SCAM produces vehicles, transfer cases, and Superstructures which can be built on SCAM produced Dailys or IVECO produced Daily's.

Vehicles
All SCAM vehicles are 4x4 with right or left hand drive, and are available with 3.5 tons and 5.5 tons chassis (chassis or crew cab). A 7.5 ton version is in development. Available models are based on the Iveco Daily Van, cabin cruiser, Combi, Minibus, Agile (with automatic gearbox), and CNG, most in all-wheel-drive. Also available is a chassis cowl i.e. the frame with drivetrain but without cab for special applications.

Superstructures
Emergency services
 Firefighting (fixed and demountable) equipment from 400 to 1500 l
 Mobile offices
 Rescue Trucks
 Ambulances

Business
 Aerial lifts
 Cranes
 Fixed and tipping platforms (with structure in alu and canvas)
 Snow Removal Vehicles with blades, salt spreaders, plows
 Radio Communication Vehicles

Defence
 Personal carrier
 Logistic and  Support Vehicles
 Armoured vehicles

Recreation
 Campers
 Minibus

Transfer cases
SCAM produces its own proprietary transfer cases with 12 or 24 gears.

See also
Bremach another Italian 4x4 manufacturer.
 Unimog German 4x4 manufacturer.

Notes

External links

 SCAM/SCV official page  (Italian)
 SCAM/SCV Official website (English)

Iveco
Defence companies of Italy
Italian brands
Vehicle manufacturing companies established in 1995
Italian companies established in 1995
Truck manufacturers of Italy
Military vehicle manufacturers